"I Will Not Let an Exam Result Decide My Fate" is a 2013 video by English spoken word poet Suli Breaks.

Overview 
The video tells the story of a mother and son who have just been to a parents' evening at school. Suli Breaks chastises parents, teachers, and the government for focusing on exams instead of nurturing raw talent.

Critical response
The Huffington Post said, "Throughout his act, Breaks explores the attitudes of today's society towards young people and exams."

See also
British hip hop

References

External links

2013 songs
Music videos
Viral videos
British short films
Films about education
Suli Breaks songs
2013 YouTube videos